The following is a list of events affecting American television during 1994. Events listed include television series debuts, finales, cancellations, and channel initiations, closures and re-brandings, as well as information about controversies and disputes.

Notable events

January

February

March

April

May

June

July

August

September

October

November

December

Programs

Debuts

Ending this year

Entering syndication this year

Resuming this year

Changing networks

Made-for-TV movies and miniseries

Television stations

Station launches

Stations changing network affiliation

Births

Deaths

Television Debuts
C. Martin Croker - Space Ghost Coast to Coast

See also
 1994 in the United States
 List of American films of 1994

Notes

References

External links 
List of 1994 American television series at IMDb

 
1990s in American television